Hibernian Football Club is a Scottish association football club based in Edinburgh. The club was founded in 1875, and played its first match on Christmas Day of that year. Hibernian have won the Scottish league championship four times, most recently in 1952. Three of those four championships were won between 1948 and 1952, when the club had the services of the Famous Five, a notable forward line. The club have won the Scottish Cup three times, in 1887, 1902, and 2016, with the latter victory ending a notorious drought. Hibs have also won the Scottish League Cup three times, in 1972, 1991, and 2007. Hibernian reached the semi-final of the first ever European Cup in 1955–56, becoming the first British side to participate in European competition

This chronological list comprises all those who have held the position of manager of the Hibernian first team. The club did not officially appoint a manager until 1903 because they did not incorporate until then. From 1875 until 1903, the club was run by a committee, although Dan McMichael was effectively the manager when the club won the 1901–02 Scottish Cup and the 1902–03 league championship. Phil Kelso took charge for season 1903–04, but left the club in April 1904 and was replaced by Dan McMichael.

As of the 2020–21 season, Hibernian have had 33 different full-time managers. McMichael is the longest-serving manager, having run the club for 17 years across two spells. Willie McCartney took charge of part of the league-winning side in 1947–48, but he died in office after a Scottish Cup match in January 1948. Hugh Shaw inherited that team, and went on to win three league championships in the late 1940s and early 1950s. Alan Stubbs won the Scottish Cup in 2015–16, ending a 114-year drought in that competition. Eddie Turnbull, Alex Miller and John Collins all won one Scottish League Cup each. Bobby Templeton, Bertie Auld, Alex McLeish and Neil Lennon all won second tier championships.

Managers

Key
Key to record:
 P = Matches played
 W = Matches won
 D = Matches drawn
 L = Matches lost
 Win % = Win ratio

Notes

References

Sources

Managers
 
Hibernian
Managers